Ali Banisadr is an Iranian-born American artist from New York City working primarily with oil painting and also with printmaking. Banisadr was ranked #1 in Flash Art's Top 100 Artists of 2011.

Early life and career
Banisadr was born in Tehran, and when he was twelve, he and his family moved to San Diego, in the United States. He moved to New York in 2000 to study a Bachelor of Fine Arts at the School of Visual Arts, and for a Master of Fine Aarts at the New York Academy of Art.

According to an interview with The Met, New York Banisadr states he is influenced by his childhood memories of growing up in Tehran during the Iran-Iraq war and the Islamic Revolution. He compares his work to Hieronymus Bosch and other figurative artists, whose work revolve around dynamism and conflict. Banisadr states he experiences the neurological condition synesthesia, which greatly affects his paintings, imbuing a sense of sound and vitriol.

Banisadr has stated many times that his work is always a combination of personal history, art history and history of our time.

He has held solo museum exhibitions at Het Noordbrabants Museum in Den Bosch, Holland, Bosch and Banisadr at Academy of fine arts in Vienna, Austria, The Benaki Museum, Athens, Greece, Matrix 185 at Wadsworth Atheneum Museum, Hartford, CT.

Public collections 
Banisadr's work is represented in the museum collections of Albright- Knox Art Gallery, Buffalo, The British Museum in London, The Metropolitan Museum of Art in New York City, Los Angeles's Museum of Contemporary Art, Centre Georges Pompidou , Paris, Los Angeles County Museum of Art, Wadsworth Atheneum, Philadelphia Museum of Art,  The artist also features in private collections such as The Olbricht Collection in Germany, Francois Pinault Foundation in Italy, London's The Saatchi Gallery, Vienna's Sammlung Essl, and The Wurth Collection in Germany.

References

External links 

 Ali Banisadr at The Metropolitan Museum of Art, NY
 Ali Banisadr Page Kasmin Gallery
 Ali Banisadr Page Galerie Thaddaeus Ropac
 Ali Banisadr Page Victoria Miro
 Ali Banisadr Page Cristea Roberts Gallery
 Brilliant Ideas: Artist Ali Banisadr Video

Iranian painters
Living people
Contemporary painters
1976 births
Iranian contemporary artists